Gertrude Elizabeth Heron Shane (née Hine;  5 February 1877 – 19 March 1951) was an Irish poet, playwright and violinist born in Belfast and who lived much of her life in County Donegal.
Among her best-known works is "Wee Hughie", a poem about a boy's first day at school.

Bibliography
Tales of the Donegal Coast and Islands (1921)	
By Bog and Sea in Donegal (1923/24)
Piper's Tunes - From Donegal and Antrim (1927)	
The Preserving Pan (play, 1933)
The Collected Poems of Elizabeth Shane Vol 1 (1945)
The Collected Poems of Elizabeth Shane Vol 2 (1945)

References

External links
"Elizabeth+Shane" Elizabeth Shane on Google Books

1877 births
1951 deaths
Irish women poets
20th-century Irish poets
20th-century Irish women writers
Irish classical violinists